José Antonio Pedrosa Galán (born 2 February 1986) is a Spanish professional footballer who plays for Gibraltar National League club Bruno's Magpies. Galan is currently the spanish player who has played in more countries so far (14).

Club career

Spain
Galán was born in León, Castile and León. A Cultural y Deportiva Leonesa youth graduate, he made his debut as a senior with Atlético Madrid's C-team in 2005, in Tercera División; in the same season,  matches with the reserves in Segunda División B.

In 2007, after one year at CD Toledo, Galán moved to UD Almería, being initially assigned to the B-side. In November 2009, after being already called up to the main squad by manager Hugo Sánchez, he suffered a serious knee injury which sidelined him for ten months.

Galán was subsequently released by the Rojiblancos, and returned to action in September 2010 while playing for division four club Atlético Astorga FC. In January of the following year, he moved to CD Comarca de Níjar in the same tier.

Journeyman
On 16 July 2011, Galán returned to his first club Cultural. On 31 January of the following year he moved abroad, after agreeing to a one-year deal with Chainat FC from the Thai Premier League; he was also the first Spaniard to ever appear in the competition.

In June 2012, Galán was released due to an ankle injury. In February 2013, he signed a two-year contract with Liga Indonesia Premier Division team Pro Duta FC, becoming the first Spanish footballer in the country in the process.

Galán switched teams and countries again on 1 March 2014, signing for Austrian Football First League's SKN St. Pölten. After appearing rarely, he moved to Shabab Al-Ordon Club in Jordania.

On 3 September 2015, Galán joined Cypriot First Division club Aris Limassol FC. He left in December due to a lack of payment, meeting the same fate at his next team, CSM Ceahlăul Piatra Neamț from Romania.

Still in 2016, Galán represented Persela Lamongan in the Indonesia Soccer Championship and Finnish Veikkausliiga's Rovaniemen Palloseura. Whilst in representation of the former, he was selected to the July Team of the Month.

On 26 July 2017, after unassuming spells at CE L'Hospitalet and FC Santa Coloma (with whom he appeared in the first qualifying round of the UEFA Champions League against FC Alashkert, a 1–1 home draw), Galán joined Hong Kong Premier League club Dreams Sports Club. Roughly one year later, he switched teams and countries again after signing for Al-Shamal SC in the Qatargas League.

Valour FC
On 15 July 2019, Galán signed a multi-year contract with Canadian Premier League side Valour FC. After making 13 league appearances in his first year and having adapted well to Winnipeg, he was retained for the following season. In September 2020 Galán signed with Spanish side Villarrobledo on a season-long deal. The deal was with the view to return to Valour for the 2021 Canadian Premier League season. On 10 May 2021, he re-signed with Valour.

In January 2022 he announced his time in Winnipeg was ending Winnipeg.

References

External links

 

1986 births
Living people
Sportspeople from León, Spain
Spanish footballers
Footballers from Castile and León
Association football midfielders
Segunda División B players
Tercera División players
Atlético Madrid C players
Atlético Madrid B players
CD Toledo players
UD Almería B players
Atlético Astorga FC players
Cultural Leonesa footballers
CE L'Hospitalet players
Jose Galan
Jose Galan
Indonesian Premier Division players
Pro Duta FC players
Persela Lamongan players
2. Liga (Austria) players
SKN St. Pölten players
Shabab Al-Ordon Club players
Cypriot First Division players
Aris Limassol FC players
Liga II players
CSM Ceahlăul Piatra Neamț players
Veikkausliiga players
Rovaniemen Palloseura players
FC Santa Coloma players
Hong Kong Premier League players
Dreams Sports Club players
Al-Shamal SC players
Saudi First Division League players
Al-Jabalain FC players
Canadian Premier League players
Valour FC players
Spanish expatriate footballers
Expatriate footballers in Thailand
Expatriate footballers in Indonesia
Expatriate footballers in Austria
Expatriate footballers in Jordan
Expatriate footballers in Cyprus
Expatriate footballers in Romania
Expatriate footballers in Finland
Expatriate footballers in Andorra
Expatriate footballers in Hong Kong
Expatriate footballers in Qatar
Expatriate footballers in Saudi Arabia
Expatriate soccer players in Canada
Spanish expatriate sportspeople in Thailand
Spanish expatriate sportspeople in Indonesia
Spanish expatriate sportspeople in Austria
Spanish expatriate sportspeople in Jordan
Spanish expatriate sportspeople in Cyprus
Spanish expatriate sportspeople in Romania
Spanish expatriate sportspeople in Finland
Spanish expatriate sportspeople in Andorra
Spanish expatriate sportspeople in Hong Kong
Spanish expatriate sportspeople in Qatar
Spanish expatriate sportspeople in Saudi Arabia
Spanish expatriate sportspeople in Canada
F.C. Bruno's Magpies players
Spanish expatriate sportspeople in Gibraltar